This is a list of elementary schools in Kanagawa Prefecture.

Municipal

Yokohama

Aoba-ku

 Aobadai (青葉台)
 Azamino Daiichi (No. 1) (あざみ野第一)
 Azamino Daini (No. 2) (あざみ野第二)
 Edanishi (West) (荏田西)
 Ekoda (荏子田)
 Enokigaoka (榎が丘)
 Fujigaoka (藤が丘)
 Ichigao (市ケ尾)
 Kamoshida Daiichi (鴨志田第一)
 Kamoshida Midori (鴨志田緑)
 Katsura (桂)
 Kenzan (嶮山)
 Kurogane (鉄)
 Kurosuda (黒須田)
 Mitakedai (みたけ台)
 Motoishikawa (元石川)
 Nara (奈良)
 Onda (恩田)
 Satsukigaoka (さつきが丘)
 Shinishikawa (新石川)
 Tana (田奈)
 Tsutsujigaoka (つつじが丘)
 Utsukushigaoka (美しが丘)
 Utsukushigaoka Higashi (East) (美しが丘東)
 Utsukushigaoka Nishi (美しが丘西)
 Yamauchi (山内)
 Yamoto (谷本)

Asahi-ku

Fudōmaru (不動丸)
Futamatagawa (二俣川)
Higashi-Kibōgaoka (東希望が丘)
Honjuku (本宿)
Ichisawa (市沢)
Imajuku (今宿)
Imajuku-Minami (今宿南)
Kami-kawai (上川井)
Kami-shirane (上白根)
Kawai (川井)
Kibōgaoka (希望ケ丘)
Makigahara (万騎が原)
Minami-Honjuku (南本宿)
Nakao (中尾)
Nakazawa (中沢)
Sachigaoka (さちが丘)
Sakon-yama (左近山)
Sasanodai (笹野台)
Shiki-no-mori (四季の森)
Shirane (白根)
Tsuoka (都岡)
Tsurugamine (鶴ケ峯)
Wakabadai (若葉台)
Zenbu (善部)

Hodogaya-ku

Arai (新井)
Bukkō (仏向)
Fujimidai (富士見台)
Fujizuka (藤塚)
Gontazaka (権太坂)
Hatsunegaoka (初音が丘)
Hodogaya (保土ケ谷)
Hoshikawa (星川)
Imai (今井)
Iwasaki (岩崎)
Kamihoshikawa (上星川)
Kamisugeta Sasa no Oka (上菅田笹の丘)
Katabira (帷子)
Kawashima (川島)
Mine (峯)
Sakamoto (坂本)
Sakuradai (桜台)
Setogaya (瀬戸ケ谷)
Tokiwadai (常盤台)

Isogo-ku

Bairin (梅林)
Byōbugaura (屏風浦)
Hama (浜)
Isogo (磯子)
Mori-higashi (森東)
Negishi (根岸)
Okamura (岡村)
Sannōdai (山王台)
Sawanosato (さわの里)
Shiomidai (汐見台)
Sugita (杉田)
Takigashira (滝頭)
Yōkōdai-Dai-ichi (洋光台第一)
Yōkōdai-Daini (洋光台第二)
Yōkōdai-Daisan (No. 3) (洋光台第三)
Yōkōdai-Daiyon (No. 4) (洋光台第四)

Izumi-ku

Higashi-nakada (東中田)
Iidakita-Ichō (飯田北いちょう)
Iseyama (伊勢山)
Izumi (和泉)
Izumino (いずみ野)
Kami-Iida (上飯田)
Kuzuno (葛野)
Nakada (中田)
Nakawada (中和田)
Nakawada-minami (中和田南)
Nishigaoka (西が岡)
Okazu (岡津)
Shimo-Izumi (下和泉)
Shinbashi (新橋)

Kanagawa-ku

Aoki (青木)
Futatsuya (二谷)
Hazawa (羽沢)
Kamihashi (神橋)
Kanagawa (神奈川)
Kandaiji  (神大寺)
Kōgaya (幸ケ谷)
Koyasu (子安)
Minami-Kandaiji (南神大寺)
Mitsuzawa (三ツ沢)
Nakamaru (中丸)
Nishiterao (西寺尾)
Nishiterao-Daini (No. 2) (西寺尾第二)
Ōguchidai (大口台)
Saitobun (斎藤分)
Shirahata (白幡)
Sugetanooka (菅田の丘)
Urashima (浦島)

Kanazawa-ku
Nishi Kanazawa Elementary/Junior High School a.k.a. Nishi Kanazawa Gakuen (西金沢学園) is a combined elementary and junior high school in Kanazawa-ku.

Elementary schools:

 Asahina (朝比奈)
 Bunko (文庫)
 Daido (大道)
 Hakkei (八景)
 Kamariya (釜利谷)
 Kamariya Higashi (釜利谷東)
 Kamariya Minami (釜利谷南)
 Kanazawa (金沢)
 Koda (小田)
 Mutsuura (六浦)
 Mutsuura Minami (六浦南)
 Nishi Shiba (西柴)
 Nishi Tomioka (西富岡)
 Nokendai (能見台)
 Nokendai Minami (能見台南)
 Segasaki (瀬ケ崎)
 Takafunedai (高舟台)
 Tomiki Chuo (Central) (並木中央)
 Tomiki Daiichi (No. 1) (並木第一)
 Tomiki Daiyon (No. 4) (並木第四)
 Tomioka (富岡)

Kohoku-ku

 Futoo (太尾)
 Hiyoshidai (日吉台)
 Hiyoshiminami (日吉南)
 Kikuna (菊名)
 Kitatsunashima (北綱島)
 Kohoku (港北)
 Komabayashi (駒林)
 Kozukue (小机)
 Mamedo (大豆戸)
 Minowa (箕輪)
 Morooka (師岡)
 Nitta (新田)
 Nippa (新羽)
 Osone (大曽根)
 Otsuna (大綱)
 Shimoda (下田)
 Shinohara (篠原)
 Shinohara Nishi (篠原西)
 Shin Yoshida (新吉田)
 Shin Yoshida Daini (No. 2) (新吉田第二)
 Shirosato (城郷)
 Takata (高田)
 Takata Higashi (高田東)
 Tsunashima (綱島)
 Tsunashima Higashi (綱島東)
 Yagami (矢上)

Konan-ku

Elementary schools:

Higiriyama (日限山)
Hino (日野)
Hino-minami (日野南)
Hishita (日下)
Kami-Ōoka (上大岡)
Kōnandai-Dai-ichi (No. 1) (港南台第一)
Kōnandai-Daini (No. 2) (港南台第二)
Kōnandai-Daisan (No. 3) (港南台第三)
Kotsubo (小坪)
Maruyamadai (丸山台)
Minamidai (南台)
Nagano (永野)
Nagaya (永谷)
Noba-Suzukake (野庭すずかけ)
Sakuraoka (桜岡)
Serigaya (芹が谷)
Serigaya-minami (芹が谷南)
Shimonagaya (下永谷)
Shimonoba (下野庭)
Sōbuyama (相武山)
Yoshihara (吉原)

Midori-ku
There is a combined elementary and junior high school, Kirigaoka Gakuen (霧が丘学園).

Municipal elementary schools:

 Higashi Hongo (東本郷)
 Ibukino (いぶき野)
 Kamiyama (上山)
 Kamoi (鴨居)
 Midori (緑)
 Miho (三保)
 Morinodai (森の台)
 Nagatsuta (長津田)
 Nagatsuta Daini (No. 2) (長津田第二)
 Nakayama (中山)
 Niiharu (新治)
 Takeyama (竹山)
 Tokaichiba (十日市場)
 Yamashita (山下)
 Yamashita Midoridai (山下みどり台)

Minami-ku

 Bessho (別所)
 Fujinoki (藤の木)
 Hie (日枝)
 Idogaya (井土ケ谷)
 Ishikawa (石川)
 Maita (蒔田)
 Minami (南)
 Minami Ota (南太田)
 Minami Yoshida (南吉田)
 Mutsukawa (六つ川)
 Mutsukawadai (六つ川台)
 Mutsukawa Nishi (六つ川西)
 Nagata (永田)
 Nagatadai (永田台)
 Nakamura (中村)
 Ooka (大岡)
 Ota (太田)

Naka-ku

 Honcho (本町)
 Honmoku (本牧)
 Honmoku Minami (本牧南)
 Kitagata (北方)
 Makado (間門)
 Motomachi (元街)
 Otori (大鳥)
 Tateno (立野)
 Yamamoto (山元)

Nishi-ku

 Azuma (東)
 Hiranuma (平沼)
 Inaridai (稲荷台)
 Ipponmatsu (一本松)
 Minato Mirai Honcho (みなとみらい本町)
 Miyagaya (宮谷)
 Nishimae (西前)
 Sengendai (浅間台)
 Tobe (戸部)

Sakae-ku

Hongō (本郷)
Hongōdai (本郷台)
Iijima (飯島)
Kamigō (上郷)
Kasama (笠間)
Katsuradai (桂台)
Kosugaya (小菅ケ谷)
Koyamadai (小山台)
Kuden (公田)
Nishihongō (西本郷)
Sakurai (桜井)
Senshū (千秀)
Shōdo (庄戸)
Toyoda (豊田)

Seya-ku

Aizawa (相沢)
Akuwa (阿久和)
Daimon (大門)
Futatsubashi (二つ橋)
Hara (原)
Kami-seya (上瀬谷)
Minami-seya (南瀬谷)
Mitsukyō (三ツ境)
Seya (瀬谷)
Seya-Daini (No. 2) (瀬谷第二)
Seya-Sakura (瀬谷さくら)

Totsuka-ku

Akiba (秋葉)
Fukaya (深谷)
Gumisawa (汲沢)
Higashi-gumisawa (東汲沢)
Higashi-matano (東俣野)
Higashi-shinano (東品濃)
Higashi-totsuka (東戸塚)
Hirado (平戸)
Hiradodai (平戸台)
Kamiyabe (上矢部)
Kashio (柏尾)
Kawakami (川上)
Kawakami-kita (川上北)
Kosuzume (小雀)
Kurata (倉田)
Maioka (舞岡)
Minami-maioka (南舞岡)
Minami-totsuka (南戸塚)
Nase (名瀬)
Sakaigi (境木)
Shimogō (下郷)
Shinano (品濃)
Taishō (大正)
Torigaoka (鳥が丘)
Totsuka (戸塚)
Yabe (矢部)
Yokohama Fukayadai (横浜深谷台)

Former elementary schools:
Matano (俣野) - Merged into Fukayadai Elementary (深谷台小学校) in 2017 to form Yokohama Fukayadai Elementary.

Tsurumi-ku

 Asahi (旭)
 Baba (馬場)
 Heian (平安)
 Higashidai (東台)
 Ichiba (市場)
 Irifune (入船)
 Kamisueyoshi (上末吉)
 Kamiterao (上寺尾)
 Kishiya (岸谷)
 Komaoka (駒岡)
 Namamugi (生麦)
 Shimosueyoshi (下末吉)
 Shin Tsurumi (新鶴見)
 Shioiri (汐入)
 Shishigaya (獅子ケ谷)
 Shitanoya (下野谷)
 Sueyoshi (末吉)
 Terao (寺尾)
 Toyooka (豊岡)
 Tsurumi (鶴見)
 Ushioda (潮田)
 Yako (矢向)

Tsuzuki-ku

Chigasaki (茅ケ崎)
Chigasakidai (茅ケ崎台)
Chigasaki-higashi (茅ケ崎東)
Eda (荏田)
Edahigashi-Dai-ichi (荏田東第一)
Edaminami (荏田南)
Higashi-yamata (東山田)
Kachida (勝田)
Kawawa (川和)
Kawawa-higashi (川和東)
Kita-yamata (北山田)
Minami-yamata (南山田)
Nakagawa (中川)
Nakagawa-nishi (中川西)
Orimoto (折本)
Sumiregaoka (すみれが丘)
Tsuda (都田)
Tsuda-nishi (都田西)
Tsuzuki (都筑)
Tsuzuki-no-oka (つづきの丘)
Ushikubo (牛久保)
Yamata (山田)

Kawasaki

Asao-ku
Municipal elementary schools:

 Asao (麻生小学校)
 Chiyogaoka (千代ヶ丘小学校)
 Haruhino (はるひ野小学校)
 Higashi Kakio (東柿生小学校)
 Kakio (柿生小学校)
 Kanahodo (金程小学校)
 Katahira (片平小学校)
 Kurigidai (栗木台小学校)
 Minami Yurigaoka (南百合丘小学校)
 Nagasawa (長沢小学校)
 Nijigaoka (虹ヶ丘小学校)
 Nishiikuta (西生田小学校)
 Okagami (岡上小学校)
 Ozenji Chuo (王禅寺中央小学校)
 Shinpukuji (真福寺小学校)
 Yurigaoka (百合丘小学校)

Former elementary schools:

 Hakusan (白山小学校) - Closed March 31, 2009 (Heisei 21)
 Ozenji (王禅寺小学校) - Closed March 31, 2009 (Heisei 21)

Kawasaki-ku
Municipal elementary schools:

 Asada (浅田小学校)
 Asahicho (旭町小学校)
 Daishi (大師小学校)
 Fujisaki (藤崎小学校)
 Higashi Monzen (東門前小学校)
 Higashi Oda (東小田小学校)
 Higashi Oshima (東大島小学校)
 Kawanakajima (川中島小学校)
 Kawasaki (川崎小学校)
 Kyomachi (京町小学校)
 Miyamae (宮前小学校)
 Mukai (向小学校)
 Oda (小田小学校)
 Oshima (大島小学校)
 Sakura (さくら小学校)
 Shincho (新町小学校)
 Tajima (田島小学校)
 Tonomachi (殿町小学校)
 Watarida (渡田小学校)
 Yotsuya (四谷小学校)

Former elementary schools:

 Higashi Sakuramoto (東桜本小学校) - Closed on March 31, 2010 (Heisei 22)
 Sakuramoto (桜本小学校) - Closed on March 31, 2010 (Heisei 22)

Miyamae-ku

 Arima (有馬小学校)
 Fujimidai (富士見台小学校)
 Hiebara (稗原小学校)
 Inukura (犬蔵小学校)
 Minami Nogawa (南野川小学校)
 Miyamaedaira (宮前平小学校)
 Miyazaki (宮崎小学校)
 Miyazakidai (宮崎台小学校)
 Mukaigaoka (向丘小学校)
 Nishi Arima (西有馬小学校)
 Nishi Nogawa (西野川小学校)
 Nogawa (野川小学校)
 Saginuma (鷺沼小学校)
 Shirahatadai (白幡台小学校)
 Sugao (菅生小学校)
 Taira (平小学校)
 Tsuchihashi (土橋小学校)

Nakahara-ku

 Gyokusen (玉川小学校)
 Higashi Sumiyoshi (東住吉小学校)
 Hirama (平間小学校)
 Ida (井田小学校)
 Imai (今井小学校)
 Kami Maruko (上丸子小学校)
 Kariyado (苅宿小学校)
 Kizuki (木月小学校)
 Kosugi (小杉小学校)
 Miyauchi (宮内小学校)
 Nakahara (中原小学校)
 Nishi Maruko (西丸子小学校)
 Ogayato (大谷戸小学校)
 Oto (大戸小学校)
 Shimogawara (下河原小学校)
 Shimokodanaka (下小田中小学校)
 Shimonumabe (下沼部小学校)
 Shinjo (新城小学校)
 Sumiyoshi (住吉小学校)

Saiwai-ku

 Furuichiba (古市場小学校)
 Furukawa (古川小学校)
 Higashi Ogura (東小倉小学校)
 Hiyoshi (日吉小学校)
 Minamigawara (南河原小学校)
 Minamikase (南加瀬小学校)
 Miyuki (御幸小学校)
 Nishi Miyuki (西御幸小学校)
 Ogura (小倉小学校)
 Saiwaicho (幸町小学校)
 Shimo Hirama (下平間小学校)
 Tode (戸手小学校)
 Yumemigasaki (夢見ヶ崎小学校)

Former elementary schools:
 Kawaramachi (河原町小学校) - Closed on March 31, 2006 (Heisei 18)

Takatsu-ku

 Higashi Takatsu (東高津小学校)
 Hisamoto (久本小学校)
 Hisasue (久末小学校)
 Kajigaya (梶ヶ谷小学校)
 Kamisakunobe (上作延小学校)
 Kuji (久地小学校)
 Minamihara (南原小学校)
 Nishi Kajigaya (西梶ヶ谷小学校)
 Sakado (坂戸小学校)
 Shibokuchi (子母口小学校)
 Shimosakunobe (下作延小学校)
 Shinsaku (新作小学校)
 Suenaga (末長小学校)
 Tachibana (橘小学校)
 Takatsu (高津小学校)

Tama-ku

 Higashi Ikuta (東生田小学校)
 Higashi Suge (東菅小学校)
 Ikuta (生田小学校)
 Inada (稲田小学校)
 Minami Ikuta (南生田小学校)
 Minami Suge (南菅小学校)
 Mita (三田小学校)
 Nagao (長尾小学校)
 Nakanoshima (中野島小学校)
 Nishi Suge (西菅小学校)
 Noborito (登戸小学校)
 Shimofuda (下布田小学校)
 Shukugawara (宿河原小学校)
 Suge (菅小学校)

Sagamihara

Chuo-ku

 Aoba (青葉小学校)
 Chuo (中央小学校)
 Fuchinobe (淵野辺小学校)
 Fuchinobe Higashi (淵野辺東小学校)
 Fujimi (富士見小学校)
 Hikarigaoka (光が丘小学校)
 Hoshigaoka (星が丘小学校)
 Kamimizo (上溝小学校)
 Kamimizo Minami (上溝南小学校)
 Koyo (向陽小学校)
 Kyowa (共和小学校)
 Namiki (並木小学校)
 Ono Kita (大野北小学校)
 Oyama (小山小学校)
 Seishin (清新小学校)
 Shinjuku (新宿小学校)
 Tana (田名小学校)
 Tana Kita (田名北小学校)
 Yaei (弥栄小学校)
 Yokodai (陽光台小学校)
 Yokoyama (横山小学校)

Midori-ku

 Aihara (相原小学校)
 Asahi (旭小学校)
 Chigira (千木良小学校)
 Fujino (藤野小学校)
 Fujino Kita (藤野北小学校)
 Fujino Minami (藤野南小学校)
 Hashimoto (橋本小学校)
 Hirota (広田小学校)
 Kawashiri (川尻小学校)
 Keihoku (桂北小学校)
 Koryo (広陵小学校)
 Kushikawa (串川小学校)
 Kuzawa (九沢小学校)
 Miyakami (宮上小学校)
 Nakano (中野小学校)
 Negoya (根小屋小学校)
 Nihonmatsu (二本松小学校)
 Osawa (大沢小学校)
 Otori (大島小学校)
 Sakunoguchi (作の口小学校)
 Shonan (湘南小学校)
 Taimada (当麻田小学校)
 Toya (鳥屋小学校)
 Tsukui Chuo (津久井中央小学校)
 Uchigo (内郷小学校)

Minami-ku

 Araiso (新磯小学校)
 Asamizo (麻溝小学校)
 Futaba (双葉小学校)
 Kami Tsuruma (上鶴間小学校)
 Kashimadai (鹿島台小学校)
 Kunugidai (くぬぎ台小学校)
 Midoridai (緑台小学校)
 Minami Ono (南大野小学校)
 Moegidai (もえぎ台小学校)
 Ono (大野小学校)
 Onodai (大野台小学校)
 Onodai Chuo (大野台中央小学校)
 Onuma (大沼小学校)
 Sagamidai (相模台小学校)
 Sakuradai (桜台小学校)
 Sobudai (相武台小学校)
 Torin (東林小学校)
 Tsurunodai (鶴の台小学校)
 Tsuruzono (鶴園小学校)
 Wakakusa (若草小学校)
 Wakamatsu (若松小学校)
 Yaguchi (谷口小学校)
 Yaguchidai (谷口台小学校)
 Yumenooka (夢の丘小学校)

Foreign government-operated
Department of Defense Education Activity (DoDEA), United States:
 John O. Arnn Elementary School - Sagamihara DHA Building, Sagamihara Housing Area, Camp Zama
 Ikego Elementary School - United States Fleet Activities Yokosuka
 Sullivans Elementary School - United States Fleet Activities Yokosuka

Private

 German School of Tokyo Yokohama (elementary division)
 Yokohama International School
 Yokohama Overseas Chinese School
 Yokohama Yamate Chinese School
  (横浜朝鮮初級学校)
  (川崎朝鮮初級学校)
 Nambu Korean Primary School (南武朝鮮初級学校).
 Tsurumi Korean Primary School (鶴見朝鮮初級学校) - North Korean international school - Kindergarten and primary school
 Horizon Japan International School

See also
 Lists of schools in Japan
 List of junior high schools in Kanagawa Prefecture

References

Schools in Kanagawa Prefecture
Elementary schools in Japan
Kanagawa Prefecture